The 1982 Washington State Cougars football team was an American football team that represented Washington State University in the Pacific-10 Conference (Pac-10) during the 1982 NCAA Division I-A football season. In their fifth season under head coach Jim Walden, the Cougars compiled a 3–7–1 record (2–4–1 in Pac-10, eighth), and were outscored 255 to 170.

The team's statistical leaders included Clete Casper with 1,070 passing yards, Tim Harris with 684 rushing yards, and Mike Peterson with 440 receiving yards.

The Cougars played two home games at Joe Albi Stadium in Spokane and four on campus at Martin Stadium in Pullman; WSU did not play USC and Arizona State this season, and met neighbor Idaho for the first time in four years in the opener.

The finale was the Apple Cup, held in Pullman for the first time in 28 years; With two wins in ten games, WSU was an 18-point home underdog and were down by ten points at the half. They took the lead in the third quarter and upset the fifth-ranked Washington Huskies,  It was the Cougars' first win over the Huskies in nine years.

Schedule

Coach staff
Head coach: Jim Walden

Assistants: Jim Burrow, Dave Elliott, Jon Fabris, Gary Gagnon, Lindsay Hughes, Steve Morton, Melvin Sanders, Harold Wheeler, Del Wight, Ken Woody

Roster

Game summaries

Washington

    
    
    
    
    
    
    
    

Source:

NFL Draft
Two Cougars were selected in the 1983 NFL Draft.

References

Washington State
Washington State Cougars football seasons
Washington State Cougars football